The MTV Europe Music Award for Best Live Act is an award category for the MTV Europe Music Awards. It was first awarded in 1995, which Take That won for their Nobody Else Tour.Lasting from March to October 1995. U2 and Ed Sheeran won the award the most times, both receiving two awards. The award was briefly named Best Headliner for the 2007 and 2008 ceremonies.

Winners and nominees
Winners are listed first and highlighted in bold.

1990s

2000s

2010s

2020s

See also
 MTV Video Music Award for Best Stage Performance

References

MTV Europe Music Awards
Awards established in 1995